The following is a list of notable events and releases that musically occurred in 2015 in South Korea.

Debuting and disbanded in 2015

Debuting groups

 1Punch
 April
 Bastarz
 Big Brain
 Bursters
 CLC
 Day6
 DIA
 GFriend
 iamnot
 iKon
 JJY Band
 MAP6
 MeloMance
 Monsta X
 MyB
 N.Flying
 Oh My Girl
 Playback
 Pretty Brown
 Romeo
 Rubber Soul
 Seventeen
 Snuper
 Twice
 Unicorn
 Up10tion
 VAV
 VIXX LR

Solo debuts

 Amber
 Baek Yerin
 Choa
 Dean
 Elo
 Elsie
Horan
 Ferlyn G
G2
 Gaeko
 G.Soul
 Goo Hara
 Jang Hyun-seung
 Jung Yong-hwa
 Junoflo
 Jonghyun
 Julian Trono
 Lee Hongki
 Lizzy
 Minah
 Miwoo
 Niel
 Park Jimin
 RM
 Shaun
 Taeyeon
 Wuno
 Lee Tae-il
 Ugly Duck
 Yezi

Disbanded groups

 1Punch
 A-Prince
 AA
 Bob Girls
 C-Clown
 EvoL
 F-ve Dolls
 Glam
 GP Basic
 Jewelry
 LC9
 M.Pire
 Shu-I
 The SeeYa
 Tiny-G
 Wonder Boyz

Releases in 2015

First quarter

January

February

March

Second quarter

April

May

June

Third quarter

July

August

September

Fourth quarter

October

November

December

See also 
 2015 in South Korea
 List of South Korean films of 2015

References 

 
South Korean music
K-pop